Caroline Miller is a planning professor and historian at Massey University, Palmerston North, and is the author of New Zealand’s first book on planning history; The Unsung Profession.

Biography
Caroline Miller graduated from the University of Auckland with a BA, and entered the planning profession in 1980.  She worked for the Palmerston North City Council as a planning practitioner. She became associated with Massey University as a teacher in programmes offered by the Property Studies Programme.

In 1995 Miller joined the School of Resource and Environmental Planning.  Having obtained a BRP, Miller went on to complete a PhD thesis on the history of the planning profession in New Zealand from 1900-1933.  Her continued research interest in planning history led to the release of The Unsung Profession in 2007.  Other research interests include urban planning generally, and the relationship between local government structures and planning practice.

References

External links
 Massey University Staff Profile

Year of birth missing (living people)
Living people
Academic staff of the Massey University
New Zealand urban planners
New Zealand women historians
University of Auckland alumni
21st-century New Zealand historians